Barry Knapp Bostwick (born February 24, 1945) is an American actor. He is best known for portraying Brad Majors in The Rocky Horror Picture Show (1975) and Mayor Randall Winston in the sitcom Spin City (1996–2002). Bostwick has also had considerable success in musical theatre, winning a Tony Award for his role in The Robber Bridegroom.

Early life
Bostwick was born February 24, 1945, in San Mateo, California. He is the son of Elizabeth "Betty" (née Defendorf), a housewife, and Henry "Bud" Bostwick, a city planner and actor. His only sibling, older brother Henry "Pete" Bostwick, died at the age of 32 in a car accident on July 20, 1973. Bostwick attended San Diego's United States International University in 1967, majoring in acting, got his start on the Hillbarn Theatre stage now located in Foster City, and worked for a time as a circus performer. He also attended NYU's Graduate Acting Program, graduating in 1968.

Career
Bostwick was a member of First National Nothing, who released one album, 1970's "If You Sit Real Still and Hold My Hand, You Will Hear Absolutely Nothing." They are described on the album as "A rock-theater commune made up of musicians, actors, dancers, singers, designers, writers, composers, and friends that started a long, long time ago as a lost tribe in California and has ended up as a theatrical performing company in New York City."

In 1970, Bostwick was a member of a pop band called The Klowns, assembled and promoted by Ringling Bros. and Barnum & Bailey Circus, whose members performed wearing stylized clown makeup and costumes. Their sole album, released in 1970, was produced by Jeff Barry, and generated a minor Billboard hit single, "Lady Love."

Bostwick replaced C.C. Courtney in the musical Salvation. His next stage appearance was in the 1971 rock opera Soon, which closed after three performances. In 1972, Bostwick originated the role of bad boy Danny Zuko in the stage production of Grease, earning a Tony Award nomination for his performance. This was followed by a voice role as Terr in the English-dubbed version of Fantastic Planet in 1973. He later starred with Tim Curry and Susan Sarandon in The Rocky Horror Picture Show (1975) portraying the character of Brad Majors. He also won a Tony Award for his performance in the 1977 musical The Robber Bridegroom. In 1981, Bostwick starred in the TV series adaptation of the 1978 movie Foul Play, with his role modeled after Chevy Chase's and co-star Deborah Raffin in Goldie Hawn's part. The following year, he starred in Megaforce. Bostwick starred, along with Carl Weintraub, as Rick Armstrong in the short-lived ABC sitcom Dads during the 1986–87 season. From 1996 to 2002, Bostwick portrayed Randall Winston, the mayor of New York City in the sitcom Spin City opposite Michael J. Fox and his successor, Charlie Sheen. In 2006, Bostwick replaced Peter Scolari as Mr. Tyler, the father of Amanda Bynes's and Jennie Garth's lead characters, on What I Like About You.

Bostwick had a recurring role between 2004 and 2007 on Law & Order: Special Victims Unit. He has also had leading roles in various mini-series, including George Washington, its sequel George Washington II: The Forging of a Nation, Scruples, A Woman of Substance, War and Remembrance, and Till We Meet Again.

Bostwick served as host of the nationally televised annual Capitol Fourth celebration on the National Mall in Washington, D.C. for eight years. Bostwick was also seen in a Pepsi Twist commercial. In the Cold Case episode "Creatures of the Night," in which he is the main suspect, the theme of the episode revolves around The Rocky Horror Picture Show, which is among his best-known performances to date.

In 2003, Bostwick appeared on Scrubs as a patient diagnosed with prostate cancer, a disease Bostwick had in real life. In 2008, he appeared in an episode of TV series Ugly Betty as an attorney to the Meade family. In 2007, Bostwick gained a recurring role, as Grandpa Clyde Flynn on the animated television series, Phineas and Ferb. Bostwick is also the spokesperson for Optimum Voice. In June 2009, he played Father Jimmy, the ineffective exorcist in the independent horror comedy The Selling, written by Gabriel Diani and directed by Emily Lou.

Other television credits include guest appearances in Charlie's Angels, Hawaii Five-O, The Golden Palace, Grace Under Fire, and Las Vegas.

Bostwick was supposed to appear on the third season of Private Practice as "the Captain," a father of the Addison Montgomery character, but had to resign due to a scheduling conflict. In 2011, Bostwick portrayed a small-town sheriff in the John Landis-produced thriller Some Guy Who Kills People

In October 2010, Bostwick briefly appeared in the Rocky Horror-themed Glee episode.

Since 2009, Bostwick has had a recurring role as Roger Frank on the sitcom Cougar Town which stars Courteney Cox. In season three of the show, we learn that Bostwick's character has become mayor of the town the comedy is set in, Gulf Haven. In 2015, he starred in Darren Lynn Bousman's segment of the anthology film Tales of Halloween, which was his second time acting under Bousman after The Devil's Carnival, and appeared in the comedy horror film Helen Keller vs. Nightwolves. In 2015, he portrayed Collin Winthrop, father of the Gig Harbor Killer, in the season-ending CSI: Crime Scene Investigation episode "The End Game." He has also had a return to cult musical horror films in the form of Terrance Zdunich's Alleluia! The Devil's Carnival, which is a sequel to the 2012 short film The Devil's Carnival, of which he was not previously a cast member, being a newcomer to the franchise.

In 2020, Bostwick executive produced and starred in the short film Molly Robber as Ron Baker, which won an Audience Award at the 2020 Austin Film Festival and was an official selection at the 2021 Tribeca Film Festival.

Personal life
Bostwick married Stacey Nelkin in 1987, and they were divorced in 1991. He married his second wife Sherri Ellen Jensen in 1993; they have two children, a son Brian Bostwick and a daughter Chelsea Bostwick.

In 1997, Bostwick was diagnosed with prostate cancer, and had his prostate removed in July 1997. In 2004, he won the Gilda Radner Courage Award from Roswell Park Comprehensive Cancer Center.

Select filmography

Film

Television

Stage productions

Video games

Web

Awards and nominations

References

Further reading
 Evans, David and Michaels, Scott. Rocky Horror: Concept to Cult. London: Sanctuary, 2002.
 Lipton, Michael A. and Matsumoto, Nancy. “Serial Dad: Michael J. Fox Looks Up to 6’4” Actor”. People March 10, 1997: 99.
 Uhry, Alfred. "The Trail of the Robber B". The Robber Bridegroom CD Liner Notes 1998: 2.
 Hunt, Paula. "Bostwick Tells Story of Survival". Express-News, March 6, 2006.

External links
 
 
 
 

1945 births
Living people
Male actors from the San Francisco Bay Area
American male film actors
American male musical theatre actors
American male stage actors
American male television actors
Best Supporting Actor Golden Globe (television) winners
People from San Mateo, California
Tony Award winners
United States International University alumni
Tisch School of the Arts alumni
Audiobook narrators